Didarul Alam is a Bangladeshi businessman and politician and the incumbent Member of Parliament from Chittagong-4. He is the Director of Mostafa-Hakim Group.

Early life
Alam was born on 6 April 1968. He has a B.A. degree.

Career
Alam was elected to Parliament on 5 January 2014 from Chittagong-4 as a Bangladesh Awami League candidate. His supporter and Jubo League leader, Ramzan Ali, was assassinated in August 2018 in Chittagong. Ramzan was accused in a number of criminal cases.

References

Awami League politicians
Living people
1968 births
10th Jatiya Sangsad members
11th Jatiya Sangsad members
People from Sandwip Upazila